The UCCU Center (originally known as the McKay Events Center), is a multi-purpose arena on the campus of Utah Valley University in southwest Orem, Utah, United States. It was built in 1996 and is home to the Utah Valley Wolverines basketball team. It is also the former home of the Utah Jazz's now defunct NBA Development League affiliate team, the Utah Flash, the Utah Valley Thunder of the American Indoor Football Association and the Utah Catzz of the Professional Indoor Football League.

Description
On January 19, 2010, the Utah Valley University announced its plans to sell the naming rights to the arena at the request of the donor family, to help the university raise money. At the same time, the university named its education building after David O. McKay. On August 30, 2010, Utah Community Credit Union (UCCU) announced it acquired the naming rights to the arena.

The UCCU Center has grown to host many top touring shows such as ZZ Top, Boston, Lonestar, Styx, Maroon 5, Lifehouse, INXS, OneRepublic, Jimmy Eat World, Paramore, Fall Out Boy, Kelly Clarkson and more recently The Killers, Phillip Phillips, Pentatonix, Panic! at the Disco and Bastille.

Concerts
Bastille brought their Bad Blood: The Last Stand Tour to the arena on November 11, 2014.

Fall Out Boy & Paramore brought their co-headlining tour, Monumentour, to the arena on August 13, 2014, with New Politics as the opening act.

Panic! at the Disco brought their Death of a Bachelor Tour to the arena on March 18, 2017, with MisterWives and Saint Motel as the opening acts.

Bastille brought their Wild, Wild World Tour to the arena on April 13, 2017, with Mondo Cozmo as the opening act.

Paramore brought their After Laughter tour to the arena on September 22, 2017, with Best Coast as the opening act.

Louis Tomlinson brought his Louis Tomlinson World Tour to the arena on March 01, 2022, with Sun Room as the opening act.

Olivia Rodrigo brought her Sour Tour to the arena on April 9, 2022, with Gracie Abrams as the opening act.

See also
 List of NCAA Division I basketball arenas

References

External links

 

College basketball venues in the United States
Defunct NBA G League venues
Sports venues in Orem, Utah
Utah Flash
Utah Valley Wolverines basketball
Sports venues completed in 1996
1996 establishments in Utah
Indoor arenas in Utah